Oakbeams is a grade II listed house on The Green, Southgate, London. Built in 1929–31, it was designed by architect Paul Badcock for George Cole, a graphic designer and artist's agent. Historic England describe Oakbeams as "an unusually elaborate example of a 'Stockbroker Tudor' inter-war suburban house".

The listing includes the surrounding walls and ironwork which includes the words "OAKBEAMS MCMXXIX" in the upper central panel.

See also
40 The Green, Southgate
Stockbroker Tudor

References

External links

Grade II listed buildings in the London Borough of Enfield
Grade II listed houses in London
Houses completed in 1931
Houses in the London Borough of Enfield
Southgate, London
Tudor Revival architecture in England